Soraya Chaouch (born ) was a French female artistic gymnast, representing her nation at international competitions.  

She participated at the 2004 Summer Olympics, and the 2003 World Artistic Gymnastics Championships.

References

External links

1988 births
Living people
Sportspeople from Dijon
French female artistic gymnasts
Place of birth missing (living people)
Gymnasts at the 2004 Summer Olympics
Olympic gymnasts of France
21st-century French women